Andrew McGill (11 July 1924 – September 1988) was a Scottish professional footballer, who played as a wing half for Third Lanark, Queen's Park, Clyde, Bradford City and Scunthorpe.

References

External links

1924 births
1988 deaths
Scottish footballers
Third Lanark A.C. players
Queen's Park F.C. players
Clyde F.C. players
Bradford City A.F.C. players
Scunthorpe United F.C. players
Association football wing halves
Footballers from Glasgow
Scottish Football League players
English Football League players